Ardath is an extinct town in Barton County, in the U.S. state of Missouri. The GNIS classifies it as a populated place.

A post office called Ardath was established in 1913, and closed in 1914. Ardath was the name of a novel by Marie Corelli.

References

Ghost towns in Missouri
Former populated places in Barton County, Missouri